Puhoi is a settlement located approximately 50 km north of Auckland, New Zealand on the banks of the Puhoi River. The name Puhoi is translated as "slow water". (Compare the Māori word , meaning "be slow, sluggish, unhurried.")

History

It was settled by Europeans on 29 June 1863 by a group of German-speaking migrants from Staab (modern Stod) in Bohemia, now a province of the Czech Republic, under the leadership of Captain Martin Krippner. This has given it the appellation of "Bohemian Settlement". Altogether three batches of migrants arrived between 1863 and 1866.

The migrants were allocated parcels of land by the colonial government. However, when the migrants arrived, the land was covered with forest, which they had to set about clearing before they could begin to use the land.

The original settlers were all of the Roman Catholic faith and one of the first things they turned their attention to was constructing a church. This was completed in 1881 and dedicated to Saints Peter and Paul whose feast day in the Catholic calendar falls on 29 June, the date of the arrival of the first settlers. The church still stands today and serves the community. The hotel and general store also have their origins from the times of the first settlers. There is a museum which occupies premises that were originally built as the Catholic primary school (1923–1964).

The Puhoi Hotel is a historical building in the area, first receiving a liquor license in 1879, when it was known as the German Hotel.

Demographics
Puhoi settlement is part of the larger Puhoi Valley statistical area.

Puhoi settlement had a population of 360 at the 2018 New Zealand census, an increase of 60 people (20.0%) since the 2013 census, and an increase of 99 people (37.9%) since the 2006 census. There were 126 households, comprising 168 males and 192 females, giving a sex ratio of 0.88 males per female, with 75 people (20.8%) aged under 15 years, 48 (13.3%) aged 15 to 29, 183 (50.8%) aged 30 to 64, and 51 (14.2%) aged 65 or older.

Ethnicities were 96.7% European/Pākehā, 5.8% Māori, 5.0% Pacific peoples, 3.3% Asian, and 2.5% other ethnicities. People may identify with more than one ethnicity.

Although some people chose not to answer the census's question about religious affiliation, 50.8% had no religion, 39.2% were Christian and 1.7% had other religions.

Of those at least 15 years old, 90 (31.6%) people had a bachelor's or higher degree, and 30 (10.5%) people had no formal qualifications. 78 people (27.4%) earned over $70,000 compared to 17.2% nationally. The employment status of those at least 15 was that 144 (50.5%) people were employed full-time, 57 (20.0%) were part-time, and 6 (2.1%) were unemployed.

Puhoi Valley statistical area

Puhoi Valley had a population of 3,702 at the 2018 New Zealand census, an increase of 561 people (17.9%) since the 2013 census, and an increase of 975 people (35.8%) since the 2006 census. There were 1,242 households, comprising 1,821 males and 1,881 females, giving a sex ratio of 0.97 males per female. The median age was 44.6 years (compared with 37.4 years nationally), with 729 people (19.7%) aged under 15 years, 573 (15.5%) aged 15 to 29, 1,848 (49.9%) aged 30 to 64, and 549 (14.8%) aged 65 or older.

Ethnicities were 93.1% European/Pākehā, 7.1% Māori, 2.4% Pacific peoples, 2.8% Asian, and 2.6% other ethnicities. People may identify with more than one ethnicity.

The percentage of people born overseas was 25.1, compared with 27.1% nationally.

Although some people chose not to answer the census's question about religious affiliation, 57.3% had no religion, 32.1% were Christian, 0.4% had Māori religious beliefs, 0.2% were Hindu, 0.1% were Muslim, 0.5% were Buddhist and 1.9% had other religions.

Of those at least 15 years old, 765 (25.7%) people had a bachelor's or higher degree, and 369 (12.4%) people had no formal qualifications. The median income was $36,800, compared with $31,800 nationally. 735 people (24.7%) earned over $70,000 compared to 17.2% nationally. The employment status of those at least 15 was that 1,554 (52.3%) people were employed full-time, 564 (19.0%) were part-time, and 66 (2.2%) were unemployed.

Library 

The Puhoi Town Library, one of the smallest in New Zealand, was established in 1923 in what was originally the Districts Road Board Office (built 1913). In the "Great Flood" of 1924 it was filled with 6 ft of silt, and its contents destroyed – the water level is marked on the building. The library was not re-established until 1977. It was flooded again in 2001. It contains over 4000 books and 500 DVDs and is staffed by a single volunteer librarian.

Films and TV
Trespasses (1984) (also known as Finding Katie during filming)
Sylvia (1985)
Bridge to Terabithia (2007) 
 (Miniseries) The village scenes were filmed in Puhoi.

References

External links
Tour of Puhoi
Puhoi Historical Society
Puhoi Egerlander dialect

Populated places in the Auckland Region
Rodney Local Board Area
Matakana Coast